Vivaha Bandham is a 1964 Indian Telugu-language drama film, produced and directed by P. S. Ramakrishna Rao of Bharani Pictures. The film stars P. Bhanumathi and N. T. Rama Rao with music composed by M. B. Sreenivasan, while Bhanumathi has taken care of supervision. It is a remake of the Bengali film Saat Pake Bandha (1963).

Plot
Bharathi is the daughter of retired principal Appa Rao. She has good values with self-esteem and confidence. Lecturer Chandrashekar gets acquainted with her and they start loving each other. Bharathi's mother Manikyamba (Suryakantham) does not like this alliance because of prestige. But Appa Rao convinces her and makes the marriage of Chandrashekar and Bharathi. After the marriage, Manikyamma always criticizes Chandrashekar, so, he leaves their house along with Bharathi and starts living happily. Manikyanba doesn't like the middle-class life of her daughter. She starts boasting about her son-in-law to the relatives. Chandrashekar gets hurt by this, so, he doesn't want to go again to her house and Bharathi is sandwiched between mother and husband. Then, step by step, ego clashes arise between the couple, both of them lose their tolerance and separate to take a divorce. In the climax, they understand that marriage is not uniting two human beings, but it is an act of uniting two souls. Finally, the movie ends on a happy note.

Cast
P. Bhanumathi as Bharati
N. T. Rama Rao as Chandra Shekar
V. Nagayya as Principal Appa Rao
Padmanabham as Kanta Rao 
M. Balaiah (guest appearance)
Haranath (guest appearance)
Prabhakar Reddy as Raghu
Vangara
Dr. Sivaramakrishnaiah
Suryakantham as Manikyamba
Hemalatha as Shantamma
Vasanthi as Aruna
Radha Kumari

Soundtrack
Music composed by M. B. Sreenivasan. Lyrics were written by C. Narayana Reddy.

References

External links
 

1964 drama films
1964 films
Indian drama films
Telugu remakes of Bengali films
Films based on works by Ashutosh Mukhopadhyay